The Men in Her Life is a 1941 period drama film directed by Gregory Ratoff and starring Loretta Young, Conrad Veidt and Dean Jagger. It is an adaptation of the 1932 novel Ballerina by the British writer Eleanor Smith.  It was nominated for the 1941 Academy Award for Best Sound Recording (John P. Livadary), but lost to That Hamilton Woman. The sets were designed by the Russian-born art director Nicolai Remisoff.

Plot
A nineteenth-century circus performer becomes a celebrated dancer, but has trouble balancing her romantic and family aspirations with her career.

Cast
 Loretta Young as Lina Varsavina
 Conrad Veidt as Stanislas Rosing
 Dean Jagger as David Gibson
 Eugenie Leontovich as Marie
 Shepperd Strudwick as Roger Chevis
 Otto Kruger as Victor
 Paul Baratoff as Manilov
 Ann E. Todd as Rose 
 Billy Ray as Nurdo 
 Ludmila Toretzka as Mme. Olenkova 
 Tommy Ladd as Lina's Dancing Partner 
 John Elliott as Andrew, Gibson's Butler
 Holmes Herbert as Second Doctor 
 Edward Van Sloan as First Doctor

References

Bibliography
 McLean, Adrienne L. Dying Swans and Madmen: Ballet, the Body, and Narrative Cinema. Rutgers University Press, 2008.

External links 
 
 

1941 films
Films based on British novels
Films based on romance novels
American black-and-white films
Films directed by Gregory Ratoff
Films scored by David Raksin
Films set in the 1850s
Films set in the 1860s
Films set in the 1870s
Films with screenplays by Michael Wilson (writer)
Columbia Pictures films
Films about ballet
1940s historical romance films
American historical romance films
1940s English-language films
1940s American films